Vimrod is a cartoon character created by Lisa Swerling & Ralph Lazar.

Vimrod is best known for its greetings cards, which sell worldwide in the millions, and books, which are published by HarperCollins and Andrews McMeel Publishing.

Published books
 Wine is Made to Be Drunk (September 2006)
 It's The Little Voices That Tell Me To Go Shopping (Sept 2006)
 Christmas is Coming. Run! (Sept 2006)
 Small Children (Sept 2006)
 You and Me, Two Hampsters on the Spinning Wheel of Life (Jan 2007)
 Life is a Struggle (Feb 2007)
 Behind Every Great Woman (Mar 2007)
 Life is a Journey (May 2007)
 The Way You Breathe (Oct 2007)
 Life is Terribly Long (Oct 2007)
 Girls Like Us Deserve the Best (Feb 2008)
 The Oil that Greases the Engine of the Soul (Jun 2008)
 Having Nine Lives Can Sometimes be Quite Tiring (Oct 2008)
 The Answer to the Universe is Woof (Oct 2008)
 Good, Evil & Chocolate (Apr 2010)

External links
 Company website

Animated characters